There's Really a Wolf is the twelfth studio album and major-label debut by American rapper Russ, who composed and produced all of the songs. It was released on May 5, 2017, by Diemon and Columbia Records and peaked at number seven on the US Billboard 200 and number four on the US Top R&B/Hip-Hop Albums. On April 18, 2018, it was certified Platinum.

Promotion
The album was announced on April 19, 2017, with a tweet revealing the album's release date of May 5, 2017.

Singles
All but four of the songs on the album were brand new releases that Russ had recorded and saved from the public eye for a span of two years. The previous released tracks "What They Want", "Pull the Trigger", "Do It Myself", and the R&B track "Losin Control", were all originally released on SoundCloud. "Me You" was sent to rhythmic radio as the third single on June 6, 2017.

Commercial performance
There's Really a Wolf debuted at number seven on the US Billboard 200 and number four on the US Top R&B/Hip-Hop Albums charts moving 49,000 album-equivalent units in its first week of release. On April 18, 2018, the album was certified platinum by the Recording Industry Association of America (RIAA) for combined sales and album-equivalent units of over a million units in the United States.

Track listing
Credits adapted from Tidal. All tracks produced by Russ.

Charts

Weekly charts

Year-end charts

Certifications

References

2017 albums
Hip hop albums by American artists
Columbia Records albums
Russ (rapper) albums